Rybinsk, the second largest city of Yaroslavl Oblast in Russia, lies at the confluence of the Volga and Sheksna Rivers, 267 kilometers north-north-east of Moscow. Population: 

It was previously known as Ust-Sheksna (until 1504), Rybnaya Sloboda (until 1777), Shcherbakov (1946–1957), and Andropov (1984–1989).

History

Early history

Rybinsk is one of the oldest Slavic settlements on the Volga River. The place was first recorded by chroniclers in 1071 as Ust-Sheksna, i.e. "the mouth of the Sheksna". During this period the settlement was a regional center for craft and metal based produce and for trade. In the mid-13th century, Ust-Sheksna was laid waste by invading Mongols. For the next few centuries, the settlement was referred to alternatively as Ust-Sheksna or Rybansk. From 1504, it was identified in documents as Rybnaya Sloboda (literally: "the fishing village"). The name is explained by the fact that the settlement supplied the Muscovite court with choice sturgeons and sterlets. In the 17th century, when the sloboda was capitalizing on the trade of the Muscovy Company with Western Europe, it was rich enough to build several stone churches, of which only one survives to the present. More old architecture may be found in the neighborhood, including the last of Muscovite three-tented churches (in the Alexandrov Hermitage) and the Ushakov family shrine (on Epiphany Island).

Golden age
In the 18th century, the sloboda continued to thrive on the Volga trade. Catherine the Great granted Rybnaya Sloboda municipal rights and renamed it Rybinsk. It was a place where the cargo was reloaded from large Volga vessels to smaller boats capable of navigating in the shallow Mariinsk Canal system, which connects the Russian hinterland with the Baltic Sea. With the population of 7,000, the town daily accommodated up to 170,000 sailors and up to 2,000 river vessels. Consequently, the local river port became known as the "capital of barge-haulers".

The town's most conspicuous landmark, the Neoclassical Savior-Transfiguration Cathedral, was constructed on the Volga riverside from 1838 until 1851. It was built to a design that the Dean of the Imperial Academy of Arts, Avraam Melnikov, had prepared for Saint Isaac's Cathedral in St. Petersburg. After Melnikov lost the contest for the best project of St. Isaac's Cathedral to Auguste de Montferrand, he sold his grandiose design to the municipal authorities of Rybinsk.

As a trade capital of the Upper Volga, Rybinsk formerly attracted scores of foreigners, who built a Lutheran church and an imposing Roman Catholic cathedral, said to be the tallest on the Volga. There is also the Nobel Family Museum, documenting the operations of that prominent Swedish family during the Russian Empire.

20th-century American film moguls Nicholas Schenck and Joseph Schenck were born in the town, and there is a grand 18th-century mansion of the Mikhalkov family, whose living members include Sergey Mikhalkov, Nikita Mikhalkov, and Andron Konchalovsky.

20th century
In the Soviet years, Rybinsk continued its impressive renaming record, for it changed its name four times: to Shcherbakov (after Aleksandr Shcherbakov) in 1946, back to Rybinsk in 1957, to Andropov (after Yuri Andropov) in 1984, and back to Rybinsk in 1989.

Administrative and municipal status
Within the framework of administrative divisions, Rybinsk serves as the administrative center of Rybinsky District, even though it is not a part of it. As an administrative division, it is incorporated separately as the city of oblast significance of Rybinsk—an administrative unit with the status equal to that of the districts. As a municipal division, the city of oblast significance of Rybinsk is incorporated as Rybinsk Urban Okrug.

Economy
The most important industries of modern Rybinsk are NPO Saturn (two plants) AL Turborus aircraft engines, power and naval gas turbines manufacturing, RGT small plant 30 - 100 MW range gas turbines, electronics radiotronics (NPO Luch), Kalashnikov Pella Rybinsk shipyard Euroyachting, Vympel Shipyard, and a hydroelectric power station. As the experts warn, the giant Rybinsk dam which holds the Rybinsk Reservoir (formerly touted as the largest man-made body of water on Earth) places the town in the imminent danger of the dam breaking and the reservoir flooding the city. The city is served by the Staroselye Airport.

Climate
Rybinsk has a four-season humid continental climate with significant differences between winters and summers, although the cold winters are still significantly less severe than those found on similar parallels further east in Russia. June, July and August all average above  in average high temperatures with the five months above  ensuring Rybinsk falls into humid continental rather than the subarctic category found further north.

International relations

Rybinsk is twinned with:

  Kingsport, Tennessee, United States (1989)  
  Johnson City, Tennessee, United States (1989)  
  Bristol, Tennessee, United States (1989)

Notable people
Aleksey Ovchinin, cosmonaut
Genrikh Yagoda, NKVD leader
Joseph M. Schenck
Nicholas Schenck
Nikita Lastochkin, racing driver
Boris Grigoriev, artist

References

Sources

External links
Official website of Rybinsk 
Unofficial website of Rybinsk 
Rybinsk Museum 
Life of Rybinsk in photos 

 
Rybinsky Uyezd
Populated places on the Volga
Golden Ring of Russia
Renamed localities in Russia